The 2004–05 Slovenian Second League season started on 8 August 2004 and ended on 5 June 2005. Each team played a total of 33 matches.

League standing

See also
2004–05 Slovenian PrvaLiga
2004–05 Slovenian Third League

References
NZS archive

External links
Football Association of Slovenia 

Slovenian Second League seasons
2004–05 in Slovenian football
Slovenia